The 2015 British Indoor Athletics Championships was an indoor track and field competition held from 14–15 February 2015 at the English Institute of Sport, Sheffield, England. A range of indoor events were held. It served as a qualifier for the British team at the 2017 European Athletics Indoor Championships.

Medal summary

Men

Women

References 

 

British Indoor Championships
British Indoor Athletics Championships
Sports competitions in Sheffield
Athletics Indoor
British Indoor Athletics Championships
Athletics competitions in England